Lie With Me is a television drama series that premiered on Channel 5 on 12 July 2021 and on Network 10 on 3 November 2021.

Synopsis
A couple moves to Australia after an affair, and encounters a nanny who brings more trouble into their lives.

Cast
 Charlie Brooks as Anna Fallmont
 Brett Tucker as Jake Fallmont
 Phoebe Roberts as Becky Hart
 Caroline Gillmer as Cynthia Fallmont
 Alba Nicholls as Grace Fallmont
 Hunter Hurley and Ned Kennelly as Oliver Fallmont
 Alfie Gledhill as Liam Henderson
 Isabella Giovinazzo as Caroline Wilder
 Nadine Garner as Detective Taormina
 Frank Magree as Officer Page
 Stephen Lopez as Detective Garrison
 Neil Melville as Ray Tucker
 John Marc Desengano as Pavan
 Bert La Bonté as Phil
 Irene Chen as Dr Katherine Lee
 Renai Caruso as Jo Murray

Production
The four part series is filmed in Melbourne with funding assistance from Film Victoria.

Episodes

Reception
In 2022, Jason Herbison, Margaret Wilson and Anthony Ellis received an AWGIE Award nomination for Best Script for Television – Limited Series.

References

External links

2021 British television series debuts
2021 British television series endings
2020s British drama television series
2021 Australian television series debuts
2020s Australian drama television series
Television series by Fremantle (company)
Television shows set in Melbourne
Network 10 original programming
English-language television shows
Television episodes written by Jason Herbison